Iryna Mykolayivna Bilyk (born 1970 in Kyiv) is a Ukrainian singer, songwriter, and People's Artist of Ukraine.

She wrote her first song at the age of ten. In 1995, Bilyk performed for the United States President Bill Clinton. She has produced twelve musical albums (including several in Russian and one in Polish), many video clips, and continues to be active in the music industry.

On 27 October 2007 Iryna Bilyk married her dancing partner from the TV show "Dances with the Stars-2", 22-year-old Dmytro Dykusar. The wedding ceremony took place in Rio de Janeiro.

Discography 
 Albums
 Kuvala zozulia (1990)
 Ya rozkazhu (1994)
 Nova (1995)
 Tak prosto (1996)
 Farby (1997)
 OMA (2000)
 Biłyk (2002)
 Kraina (2003)
 Lyubov. Yad (2004)
 Na bis (2008)
 Rassvet (2014)
 Bez grima (2017)

 Singles
 "Ne khovay ochey" (2018)

Awards
 Order of Princess Olga, Third Class (2020)

References

External links
 Official site of Iryna Bilyk 

1970 births
Living people
21st-century Ukrainian women singers
Ukrainian pop singers
Recipients of the title of People's Artists of Ukraine
Recipients of the title of Merited Artist of Ukraine
Musicians from Kyiv
Ukrainian LGBT rights activists
20th-century Ukrainian women singers
Recipients of the Order of Princess Olga, 3rd class